Polina Igorevna Tsurskaya (pronounced TSOO-rskaya; , born 11 July 2001) is a Russian former competitive figure skater and figure skating coach. She is the 2017 NHK Trophy bronze medallist.

On the junior level, she is the 2016 Winter Youth Olympic champion, the 2015 Junior Grand Prix Final champion, a four-time Junior Grand Prix event champion, and the 2015 Russian junior national champion.

Personal life 
Polina Igorevna Tsurskaya was born on July 11, 2001 in Omsk, Russia. She has an elder brother, Igor, who is nine years her senior. She moved to Moscow in 2013.

Career

Early years 
Tsurskaya began skating in 2005. Coached by Tatiana Odinokova in Omsk until 2013, she joined Eteri Tutberidze and Sergei Dudakov after relocating to Moscow. Fifth in her first appearance at the Russian Junior Championships, in 2014, she finished fourth in 2015.

2015−2016 season 
Tsurskaya made her international debut in August 2015 at the Junior Grand Prix (JGP) in Bratislava, Slovakia. She was awarded the gold medal after placing first in both segments and finishing 10 points ahead of the silver medalist, Mai Mihara. Outscoring Ekaterina Mitrofanova by 21 points, she won her next JGP assignment, in Toruń, Poland, and qualified for the final. At the 2015–16 JGP Final, held on December in Barcelona, she won the gold medal with personal best scores in both segments and a total of 195.28 points. She broke the junior records in the free skate and total scores set by compatriot Elena Radionova. Competing on the senior level, Tsurskaya finished fourth later in December at the Russian Championships before winning her first junior national title in January.

In February, Tsurskaya won gold at the 2016 Winter Youth Olympics in Lillehammer, Norway. In March, she was scheduled to compete at the 2016 World Junior Championships in Debrecen but withdrew before the start of the event. An ankle injury had occurred a day before she departed for the event and was aggravated when she fell in Hungary during the morning practice before the short program. After three months during which she had to avoid running and jumping, she resumed training in early June.

2016–2017 season 
In September 2016, Tsurskaya won gold at two JGP series events; she ranked first in the short program and second in the free in Saransk, Russia, and first in both segments in Tallinn, Estonia. She was the second-ranked qualifier to the JGP Final in Marseille, but withdrew on 29 November. She underwent surgery on her right knee and resumed practicing jumps in mid-December.

Tsurskaya finished tenth at the 2017 World Junior Championships in Taipei, Taiwan. During the season, she was diagnosed with osteochondritis dissecans and a herniated disc.

2017–2018 season 
Making her senior international debut, Tsurskaya won the bronze medal at the 2017 NHK Trophy, setting personal best scores in both segments. In November, Tsurskaya finished fourth at 2017 Skate America, placing eighth in the short program and fourth in the long program and scoring 195.56 points total.

On May 7, 2018 it was announced Tsurskaya was ending her partnership with coach Eteri Tutberidze.

2018–2019 season 
Tsurskaya began her season by competing at the 2018 CS Ondrej Nepela Trophy where she placed fourth. In her Grand Prix events, she placed seventh at the 2018 Skate America and eighth at the 2018 Rostelecom Cup.  She placed fourteenth at the 2019 Russian Championships. Tsurskaya announced her retirement from figure skating on May 31, 2019.

Coaching 

In summer 2020 Polina started working as a figure skating coach in the skating club Sambo-70, Chrustalnyi department, in a cooperation with the team of her former coach Eteri Tutberidze. She mainly works with children.

Achievements
 Set the junior-level ladies' record for the free program to 128.59 points at the 2015–16 Junior Grand Prix Final, previously held by Elena Radionova. Record was broken by Marin Honda at the  2016 JGP Japan.
 Set the junior-level ladies' record for the combined total to 195.28 points at the 2015–16 Junior Grand Prix Final, previously held by Elena Radionova. Record was broken by Alina Zagitova at the 2016–17 Junior Grand Prix Final.
 Set the junior-level ladies' record for the short program to 69.02 points at the 2016 JGP Russia, previously held by Evgenia Medvedeva. Record was broken by Alina Zagitova at the 2016–17 Junior Grand Prix Final.

Programs

Competitive highlights 

GP: Grand Prix; CS: Challenger Series; JGP: Junior Grand Prix

Detailed results

Senior level

Junior level 

Previous ISU Junior world records highlighted in bold.

References

External links 

 
 

! colspan="3" style="border-top: 5px solid #78FF78;" |Historical World Junior Record Holders (before season 2018–19)

2001 births
Russian female single skaters
Living people
Sportspeople from Omsk
Figure skaters at the 2016 Winter Youth Olympics
Youth Olympic gold medalists for Russia